Christine Margarete Anderson is a German politician who has served as a Member of the European Parliament since 2019. A member of the Alternative for Germany (AfD), Anderson has been described as a supporter of the Pegida movement.

Background and education
Anderson was born in Eschwege, Hesse, West Germany. She completed a commercial apprenticeship. She lived in the United States for six years, where she studied economics and worked for a US trading company.

Political career 
In 2013 Anderson became a member of Alternative for Germany (AfD). From 2016 to 2018, she was the party's group leader in the Limburg-Weilburg district assembly. She was elected to the European Parliament in the 2019 election. Before the election, she stated her goal was to "lead Germany out of this EU nightmare". 

Der Spiegel, a left-leaning publication, has described Anderson as an activist of the Pegida alliance. She has participated in Pegida street protests promoting immigration reform. She has also appeared on Rebel News, where she stated her support for the Canada convoy protest.

In the European Parliament, Anderson is a member of the Committee on Culture and Education, the Committee on Women's Rights and Gender Equality, and the Special Committee on Artificial Intelligence in the Digital Age, and a deputy member of the Committee on the Internal Market and Consumer Protection.

Most recently, Anderson was appointed to the Special Committee on the COVID-19 Pandemic, and in a July 2022 session she entered into the record a complaint that there had been too much emphasis upon getting experimental gene therapy treatments into healthy people.

Personal life
Anderson has three children and lives in Fulda.

References

External links
 Christine Anderson - Mitglied des Europäischen Parlaments
 Home | Christine ANDERSON | MEPs | European Parliament
 Spiegel.de: AfD sets up a team of candidates critical of Europe, 18th November 2018
 AfD Hessen: Direct candidate Christine Anderson 

1968 births
Living people
Counter-jihad activists
MEPs for Germany 2019–2024
Alternative for Germany MEPs
People from Eschwege
21st-century women MEPs for Germany